Nimrod Mashiah (also spelled Nimrod Mashiach; Hebrew: נמרוד משיח, born 10 July 1988) is an Israeli windsurfer.

In 2001, Mashiah received the Young Artist Award as an Outstanding Young Actor in an International Commercial for his role as a diver/actor in a television commercial. Surfing on the RS:X model, Mashiah was the 2009 Windsurfing World Championships silver medalist, and won the bronze medals at both the 2010 and 2011 World Championships.

In September 2010, he was ranked # 1 in the world in men's windsurfing. In September 2014, Israel qualified to have a male RS:X windsurfer represent Israel at the 2016 Summer Olympics, with Mashiah winning the quota place.  He is Jewish, and lives in Mikhmoret, Israel.

Acting career
In 2001, at the 22nd Young Artist Awards, Mashiah received the Young Artist Award as an Outstanding Young Actor in an International Commercial for his role as a diver/actor in a Cheltenham & Gloucester television commercial "The Pearl".

Windsurfing career
Gal Fridman, an Israeli former windsurfer and Olympic gold medalist, was Mashiah's coach until 2013, when he took on as his new coach Tom Korzits, the brother of Israeli four-time world champion windsurfer Lee Korzits.

In 2001 Mashiah won the gold medal in Thailand and was the Youth World Champion in the 15-year-old age group in windsurfing, in 2003 he won the bronze medal at the Youth European Championship, and in 2004 he won the silver medal at the Youth World Championship.

In 2009, at the RS:X Windsurfing World Championships in Weymouth, England, Mashiah won the silver medal, behind Britain's 2004 Olympic bronze medalist Nick Dempsey.

In September 2010, at the age of 22, at the RS:X Windsurfing World Championships in Kerteminde, Denmark, he won the bronze medal. That month he was ranked #1 in the world in men's windsurfing. In December 2010, the Olympic Committee of Israel named him the athlete of the year. Mashiah received a cash prize of NIS 40,000.

In September 2011, at the RS:X European Championships in Burgas, Bulgaria, he finished eighth.

In December 2011, at the RS:X World Windsurfing Championships in Perth, Australia, Mashiah came in third behind Dorian van Rijsselberghe of the Netherlands and Piotr Myszka of Poland and won a bronze medal.

2008 Olympic bronze medal winner Shahar Zubari took Israel's berth in men's windsurfing at the 2012 London Olympic Games. Each country was allowed to send only one windsurfer to compete in the Olympics.

In March 2013, at the RS:X World Windsurfing Championships in Buzios, Brazil, Mashiah finished sixth.

In September 2014, Israel qualified to have a male RS:X windsurfer represent Israel at the 2016 Summer Olympics, with Mashiah winning the quota place.  As of 27 April 2015, Mashiah was the top-ranked Israeli male windsurfer.

See also

 List of World Championships medalists in sailing (windsurfer classes)
 List of Jewish sailors
 Sports in Israel

References

External links
 
 

1988 births
Living people
Israeli windsurfers
Israeli Jews
Jewish sailors (sport)
People from Eilat
Sportspeople from Central District (Israel)
Israeli people of Dutch-Jewish descent